Pooja Singh was an Indian television actress best known for her portrayal of Emily Rathi in Diya Aur Baati Hum and Raavi Singh in Shakti Astitva Ke Ehsaas Ki, both of which rank among the Indian longest running television shows.

Personal life
She is currently single .Not dating anyone as per source

Television

References

External links

Living people
Indian television actresses
Year of birth missing (living people)